Endel Eduard Taniloo, born Danilov (5 January 1923 – 28 November 2019), was an Estonian sculptor and recipient of Order of the White Star in 2002. He was born in Tartu.

References

1923 births
2019 deaths
20th-century Estonian sculptors
20th-century Estonian male artists
People from Tartu
Recipients of the Order of the White Star, 4th Class
Male sculptors